Haedropleura hanleyi is a species of sea snail, a marine gastropod mollusk in the family Horaiclavidae.

It was previously included within the family Turridae.

It is species inquirenda. It is spurious taxon, of which no types could be traced and it may be a species of ''Propebela.

Description

Distribution
This species occurs in the English Channel off France.

References
This article incorporates CC-BY-SA-3.0 text from the reference

External links
 
  Tucker, J.K. 2004 Catalog of recent and fossil turrids (Mollusca: Gastropoda). Zootaxa 682:1-1295.

hanleyi